Sumich is a surname. Notable people with the surname include:

 Antony Sumich (born 1964), Croatian rugby and cricket player, rugby coach, and priest
 Peter Sumich (born 1968), Australian rules footballer
 Roger Sumich (born 1955), cyclist from New Zealand

Croatian surnames